Finn Christopher Hudson is a fictional character from the Fox musical comedy-drama series Glee. The character was portrayed by Cory Monteith and first appeared on television when Glee premiered its pilot episode on Fox on May 19, 2009. Finn was developed by Glee creators Ryan Murphy, Brad Falchuk, and Ian Brennan. Glee follows the trials of the New Directions glee club at the fictional William McKinley High School in the town of Lima, Ohio. Finn is initially quarterback of his high school football team. A popular jock at the top of the school's social hierarchy, when he finds himself forced to join the school's glee club, he discovers that he loves it, although he risks alienation from his friends by remaining a member. His storylines see him struggle with his decision to stay in the club, which is at the bottom of the social ladder, while he maintains his popular reputation and the respect of the other jocks. The character has dealt with his attraction to both self-centered head cheerleader Quinn Fabray (Dianna Agron) and ambitious yet kindhearted glee club star singer Rachel Berry (Lea Michele), the series' female lead. Following Monteith's death on July 13, 2013, it was announced that Finn's own death would occur in the third episode of the fifth season, titled "The Quarterback".

Monteith felt that Finn has had to grow up a lot during his time on the show. The actor said, "Finn started off as the stereotypical dumb jock but as the show has gone on, Finn's not dumb anymore, really, he’s just a little naïve." Early reviews of Finn from television critics were mixed; Emily VanDerWerff of The A.V. Club said that he and Michele were "both agreeable and a little desperate for an outlet" in the pilot episode. Commenting on the fifth episode of the first season, Eric Goldman of IGN wrote, "We got to see a bit of a darker side to Finn [...] it's good to see this, because up until now, Finn's been a bit too straight-laced to totally invest in." In the second season's eighth episode, "Furt", Entertainment Weekly Tim Stack said, "It's been a while since we’ve gotten some Finn focus, and I think I just missed Cory Monteith. But I also forgot what a good, natural actor he can be." Monteith as Finn won the 2011 Teen Choice Award for Choice TV: Actor Comedy, and was nominated in the same category in 2010.

Although he was not a singer before being cast as Finn, Monteith sang lead or joint lead on many songs on the show, most of which have charted in the US and abroad. "Jessie's Girl", which Finn performed as a solo, was certified gold in Australia, one of only three singles to do so from the show's releases in that country; he was joint lead on "Don't Stop Believin' in the pilot episode, the show's first single sung by the glee club, which was certified gold and platinum in Australia and the US.

Development

Casting and creation

Finn Hudson is portrayed by Cory Monteith. He has also been portrayed as a child by Jerry Phillips in "Pilot" and as a preschooler by Jake Vaughn in the episode "The Substitute". When Glee was being cast, Monteith's Vancouver agent, Elena Kirschner, submitted a video of him drumming with some pencils and Tupperware containers. Series creator (Ryan Murphy) took notice of the video, but pointed out that he had to be singing, as auditioning actors for Glee with no theatrical experience were required to prove they could sing and dance as well as act. Monteith submitted a second, musical tape, in which he sang "a cheesy, '80s music-video-style version" of REO Speedwagon's "Can't Fight This Feeling". He then attended a mass audition in Los Angeles; his vocal skills were considered weak, but he later performed very well with one of Glee casting directors, who said that his audition captured the most elusive quality of Finn's, his "naive, but not stupid sweetness". Monteith said of his casting process, "I was like a lot of kids, looking for something to be interested in. Something to be passionate about. All you need is permission. Not only for Glee, but for anything in life."

In December 2010, Murphy announced that some members of the cast of Glee would be replaced after the end of the third season in spring 2012, to coincide with their graduation. Murphy said: "Every year we're going to populate a new group. There's nothing more depressing than a high schooler with a bald spot." He added, "I think you have to be true to the fact that here is a group of people who come and go in these teachers' lives." Although Murphy said in July 2011 that Monteith would be one of the actors leaving at the end of the third season, Falchuk later stated that while Monteith, along with Lea Michele and Chris Colfer, would graduate at the end of the third season, "because they're graduating doesn't mean they're leaving the show." Falchuk insisted that "it was never our plan or our intention to let them go…. They are not done with the show after this season."

Characterization
Finn originated as a character who "walks a fine line between following his dreams and balancing what other people expect of him." Monteith's former acting coach said: "You've got to be incredibly smart to understand how dim Finn can be", though Monteith appreciated the fact that Finn is more than "just a dumb jock". He has admitted that he is sometimes frustrated by Finn's "convenient dumb-guy writing", and commented, "I think every actor wants to be stretched. But it's also important to realize that whatever we're doing works. I realize that this happens to an actor about once every ten lifetimes. To be on a show that's this good, it's rarefied air." Finn has matured during his run on the series—in January 2011, Monteith noted that he had "grown up a little bit" and become "a little wiser". He later expanded, "Finn's not dumb anymore, really, he’s just naive. The opposite of me. I love Finn’s optimism. He’s very idealistic; he wants a good girl to love him, and he chases after what he wants in life—that I can relate to." The actor hoped that in time his character would be able to grow and mature more. He said in an interview with MTV, "I think the harder it is for him, the better, you know? I think Finn has a lot of growing up to do and I think that Finn has a lot of struggle left for him. I think dealing with a lot of his dad stuff, the passing of his father and dealing with the unrequited love all of a sudden from Rachel, I think the more trouble he goes through, the more interesting it is for me as an actor."

Over the course of his run on the series, Finn's primary relationship has been with the glee club's main singer, Rachel. In a meeting with the press at PaleyFest2011, which occurred when the characters were in the middle of a months-long breakup, Monteith commented: "That's a very important central relationship to the show. I think it's important, and I think they're endgame, but I can't be sure of when. I try not to get too attached to the pairing, so I can focus on storyline that does come my way." Falchuk said of the Finn–Rachel relationship ahead of the third season, "We're not interested in breaking them up this year but at the same time the challenge is they are graduating, they are different kinds of people and where does that take you?" During the PaleyFest2011 Glee cast interview, Monteith said, "There are a lot of people who really, really want Finn and Rachel to be together. But at the same time, I think that it's really interesting when they're clearly in love with each other but they're apart. I think it makes for good television." He added, "I think there's a different dynamic to Finn with Quinn and with Rachel, and single."

Storylines

Season 1

Finn is introduced as a mean, aggressive quarterback of the William McKinley High School football team. He throws openly gay student Kurt Hummel (Chris Colfer) into a dumpster and writes inappropriate messages about the glee clubs. He is blackmailed into joining the school glee club as a punishment, New Directions, by its faculty director Will Schuester (Matthew Morrison). Despite being ostracized by the other football players, including his best friend Puck (Mark Salling), Finn comes to enjoy being in the club. This worries his girlfriend, head cheerleader Quinn Fabray (Dianna Agron), so she joins New Directions to keep an eye on him, afraid that lead singer Rachel Berry's (Lea Michele) interest in Finn may be reciprocated. Quinn discovers that she is pregnant, as she had cheated on Finn with Puck, but tells Finn that the baby is his, though they never actually had intercourse. She subsequently moves in with Finn and his mother Carole (Romy Rosemont) after her parents find out about her pregnancy and evict her. When Rachel figures out that Puck is the father and informs Finn, he attacks Puck, breaks up with Quinn, and quits the glee club in a fury; but after cheerleading coach Sue Sylvester (Jane Lynch) sabotages the glee club's first show choir competition, he is able to set aside his anger and return to lead the club to victory. He and Rachel briefly date, but he ends the relationship to concentrate on his own well-being. By the time Finn realizes that he truly does want to be with Rachel, he is chagrined to discover that she has started dating Jesse St. James (Jonathan Groff), the lead singer of rival glee club Vocal Adrenaline. Cheerleader Santana Lopez (Naya Rivera) offers to take Finn's virginity to improve her social status and his, and he accepts, but afterward he regrets having done so and claims to Rachel that he did not go through with it; she, in turn, falsely claims to have had sex with Jesse. By the time the club reach the next stage of show choir competitions, Jesse has betrayed Rachel and broken up with her. As Finn and Rachel are about to go onstage, Finn tells her that he loves her; although they lose the competition, they become a couple and continue dating well into the next school year.

Glee club member Kurt Hummel (Chris Colfer), who is gay, has a private crush on Finn, and sets up his father Burt (Mike O'Malley) with Finn's mother Carole in the hopes of spending more time with him. Finn initially opposes the relationship, worried that his mother will forget about his late father, but relents when Burt tells Finn that he loves Carole, though Kurt is dismayed by the deepening rapport between Finn and Burt. Finn and his mother eventually move in with the Hummels, but when Finn, uncomfortable about rooming with Kurt. Finn continues to harass Kurt about how he once had a crush on him, uses a homophobic slur against Kurt during an argument and scares Burt, Burt, terrified of Finn’s aggressive behavior throws him out. Finn is ashamed, and makes amends by standing up for Kurt when he is victimized by bullies. The following fall, the bullying against Kurt has intensified, but Finn refuses to stand up for him this time, concerned that it may jeopardize his position as quarterback. When their parents marry, Finn uses his best man speech as an opportunity to apologize to Kurt, which begins a brotherly bond between the two. In the spring, the two of them team up to arrange the funeral of Sue Sylvester's sister, Jean (Robin Trocki), when Sue is too upset to do so, after which Sue ends her long-running campaign to destroy the glee club.

Season 2
At the beginning of the second season, Finn is still selfish and throws a tantrum at new student Sam Evans (Chord Overstreet), and makes nasty remarks about his mouth, makes fun of the new football coach, Shannon Beiste (Dot-Marie Jones), who briefly kicks him off the team for his nasty behavior. He continues more trouble by giving cheerleading coach Sue Sylvester a list of lies about her as revenge. He is eventually reinstated after an apology from Rachel Berry, and soon becomes quarterback again. Rachel learns the truth about Finn sleeping with Santana. Hurt, she makes out with Puck to get even with Finn; this betrayal causes Finn to break up with her. The football team clinches a spot in the championship game, but animosity is running high between glee and non-glee members and harming the team's performance. In "The Sue Sylvester Shuffle", Coach Beiste and Will Schuester force the entire football team to join the glee club for a week to settle their differences and dispel their prejudices. After a promising start, the non-glee members quit the club and are kicked off the team; at the same time, Sue arranges to have the cheerleading Regionals rescheduled to conflict with the football championship to sabotage both Beiste and Will, whose glee club now has to do the halftime show. With the football team down to half strength and the glee club without its cheerleader members, football players Finn and Puck settle their differences; Puck convinces the non-glee football players to perform in the halftime show, which will also get them back on the team, while Finn convinces Quinn, Santana, and Brittany (Heather Morris) to quit the Cheerios and perform in the halftime show instead. The show is a great success, and the football team wins the championship game.

Emboldened by leading the team to the championship, Finn sets his eyes on a new prize: Quinn, who is in a serious relationship with football player and glee club member Sam Evans (Chord Overstreet). After setting up a kissing booth ostensibly to raise money for the glee club, Finn succeeds in kissing Quinn, and they make an assignation. Although Quinn ultimately decides to stay with Sam, he finds out about her cheating on him with Finn, and breaks up with her. Finn and Quinn reunite, and campaign together for prom king and queen and go to have popularity status, but Finn is kicked out for fighting with a newly returned Jesse over Rachel, and prom king and queen are won by other students. Finn ultimately breaks up with Quinn again because he realizes how deep his feelings are for Rachel. At Nationals, as the New Directions are about to go on stage, Finn begs Rachel to come back to him, but though she professes her love, she refuses, still torn between her lifelong dream of Broadway stardom and her love for him. At the end of their duet—"Pretending", written by Finn—the audience responds with awkward silence as Rachel and Finn actually kiss; the club consequently fails to place at Nationals. Back in Ohio, Rachel tells Finn she is moving to New York for college and will not be coming back; he reminds her that they have a whole year until graduation and they kiss, renewing their relationship.

Season 3
As the new school year begins, Finn, a senior, has trouble figuring out what he wants to do with his life after graduation. In the fifth episode, "The First Time", Finn is not recruited to play football in college, as he had hoped. He and Rachel decide to have sex together for the first time. In the episode "Mash Off", Santana, who has joined the rival Troubletones, is relentlessly bullying Finn. After a fake apology pushes him to the edge, Finn tells her to just "come out of the closet" and accuses her of being a coward for tearing other people down only because she can't admit to everyone that she's in love with Brittany. They are overheard by a girl whose uncle is running against Sue in a congressional campaign, and he uses Santana's lesbianism—because she's Sue's cheerleading co-captain—against Sue in a campaign commercial, effectively "outing" her. Santana, devastated by this, slaps Finn, but he later claims it was a "stage slap" to prevent her from being suspended. In the episode "Yes/No", Finn asks Rachel to marry him. In the episode "On My Way", the wedding is set for after the Regionals competition, which New Directions wins, but it is canceled after Quinn is badly injured in a car crash on her way to the ceremony. They change the wedding date to after graduation, but after Finn fails to get into his New York acting school while she has been accepted by hers and she decides to wait a year, he instead sends her off to New York without him, and tells her that he has enlisted in the army and is "setting her free".

Season 4
Finn has not been in touch with Rachel or Kurt all summer and into the fall—the two friends are now rooming together in Brooklyn while Rachel is attending NYADA—but he reappears unexpectedly at the end of the third episode. He has been given an early discharge from the army after injuring himself. He finds out she kissed Brody (Dean Geyer), a NYADA junior, and feels that he doesn't belong in her world in New York, so he returns to Lima without telling her. She then breaks up with him. In Lima, Finn is working at Burt's tire shop again, and Artie enlists his help to co-direct the school musical, Grease, which had been Finn's suggestion. When Rachel comes to see the musical in the "Glease" episode, their reunion does not go well, and they agree to refrain from contact when Rachel visits Lima in the future. Will takes a leave of absence from McKinley to be a member of a blue-ribbon panel in Washington, DC, so starting in "Dynamic Duets", Finn becomes the interim director of New Directions. While he has a rocky start in the position, they come to accept him as their leader. At Sectionals, the glee club loses to the Warblers after Marley (Melissa Benoist) passes out on stage, interrupting the performance. Afterward, Finn does what he can to keep the club together and finally succeeds despite Sue's opposition—she has deprived New Directions of rehearsal space at school. The Warblers are disqualified, and New Directions is again eligible to compete in Regionals; the choir room is returned to them. Finn enlists Emma, who is deep in wedding preparations in advance of Will's return, to help him judge a glee club competition for which member is the best diva. When he finds her panicking over the reception arrangements, he kisses her. In "I Do", when Emma flees the church the day of the wedding, Finn blames himself, but Rachel sets him straight, and he and Rachel sleep with each other post-reception. In "Girls (and Boys) On Film", Finn teams up with Artie to help find Emma for Will; he later confesses to Will that he kissed Emma, and Will is unable to forgive him. Since working with Will is untenable, Finn leaves New Directions though he enjoyed directing them; Marley tells him he's a good teacher, and he should get a teaching degree. He goes to college, where he shares a dorm room with Puck—who isn't actually attending the school. Will later asks Finn to return to co-lead New Directions, and he agrees. Meanwhile, Santana has discovered that Brody, who is now living with Rachel, is a gigolo, and tells Finn, who flies to New York and warns Brody away, ultimately beating him up and saying, "Stay away from my future wife." When Rachel finds out and breaks up with Brody, she admits that the relationship never would have worked because she was using it to try to get over her heartache about Finn. Rachel later thanks him for his intervention in "Sweet Dreams" when she calls him to get advice for choosing an audition song for the upcoming Broadway revival of Funny Girl.

Season 5
"The Quarterback", the third episode of the fifth season, opens three weeks after Finn's funeral. No cause of death is given. Kurt, in a voiceover, explains that it is not the circumstances of Finn's death that matter, but how he lived his life.

Season 6
In the flashback episode "2009", the original Glee club members have second thoughts about Finn being the leader of the new club. After talking about how different Finn is from the other school jocks, they decide to let him stay in the club. The scene moves to the New Directions, with Finn, singing Don't Stop Believing from the "Pilot" episode.

In the series finale "Dreams Come True", U.S. Vice President Sue Sylvester rededicates the McKinley High auditorium to be named in honor of Finn.

Musical performances
As Finn is the most frequent male lead in New Directions numbers, Monteith features in a great many musical performances which have been released as singles available for digital download and are also featured in the show's soundtrack albums. He frequently shares vocal leads with the main female singer, Rachel, as in the pilot episode's closing song, Journey's "Don't Stop Believin', the single of which has sold over a million copies and been certified platinum in the US and Australia.

Like Finn, Monteith was a novice singer when the show started. In an interview with GQ Alex Pappademus, he noted that, early on, "you could hear the Auto-Tune." He was not called on to sing much on the first few episodes, as he rapped in "Push It" for "Showmance", had a short solo phrase in the song "I Wanna Sex You Up" in "Acafellas", and was not featured as a vocal lead in "Preggers". Over the next three episodes, he shares the lead on four group numbers. Two are with Rachel and One with Artie, Rachel, and Mercedes: Queen's "Somebody to Love", "No Air" and "Keep Holding On". The fourth is a boys-only mash-up of Bon Jovi's "It's My Life" with Usher's "Confessions Part II", where Finn sings lead on the "It's My Life" sections and Artie on the rest.

Excluding a scene from the pilot of him singing a portion of "Can't Fight This Feeling" in the shower, Finn's first solo songs are not until the show's tenth episode, "Ballad". Finn sings "I'll Stand By You" to the unborn child he thinks is his, and later sings "(You're) Having My Baby" to Quinn, the mother of the child, in front of her parents, who respond with her mother being forced to watch as her father evicts her from the family home. He has two solo numbers later in the season: "Hello, I Love You" by The Doors, characterized by Bobby Hankinson of the Houston Chronicle as "one of Finn's best vocal performances to date", and "Jessie's Girl" by Rick Springfield; the latter song charted in the top ten in Australia, Canada and Ireland, and was certified gold in Australia, one of only three singles from Glee to have received gold certification in that country.

Finn sings lead more frequently in the second half of the first season, as he is featured in over a dozen songs, including several with Rachel. However, in Glee second season, he sings lead in fewer songs than in the first, though he again sings a significant proportion with Rachel, including the duets "Don't Go Breaking My Heart", "With You I'm Born Again", "Last Christmas", and the one ostensibly written by Finn at the end of the season, "Pretending". His first solo performance of the second season, in the episode "Grilled Cheesus", is R.E.M.'s "Losing My Religion". Monteith said he and series music producer Adam Anders "had a bit of a different idea" about how the song should be performed. While Anders "always brings the songs in very positive, very upbeat", he felt the song "was expressing a betrayal", and with Finn feeling both betrayal and anger, Monteith wanted his performance to reflect that. Anthony Benigno of the Daily News commented positively on the arrangement of Monteith's song, and graded the performance an "A", but Erica Futterman of Rolling Stone was critical of the arrangement, and said Monteith's performance was "more awkward than inspired." Finn's other solo is "I've Gotta Be Me" in the episode "Born This Way".

In the episode "Furt", when Finn's mother marries Kurt's father and the glee club provides music for the wedding, two of the songs are by Bruno Mars: "Marry You", which is sung by the entire club as a big processional production number, and "Just the Way You Are", which is sung by Finn to Kurt at the reception. Raymund Flandez of The Wall Street Journal characterized the "two Bruno Mars songs" as "brilliant in execution and touching in sentiment", and Futterman agreed: "the Bruno Mars songs gave the show two of its best performances this season". While Benigno and Stack also praised "Just the Way You Are", and both gave the song an "A", Jen Harper of BuddyTV thought Monteith's vocals as Finn "aren't the strongest" and AOL TV Jean Bentley also wished Finn had not been the soloist. In "The Sue Sylvester Shuffle", Finn led his football teammates, some of whom were performing with the glee club under duress, in The Zombies' "She's Not There". VanDerWerff called it "one of the better numbers of the season", and Futterman felt that Monteith's vocals were a "perfect fit" for the song. Finn's sole duet with Quinn, Fleetwood Mac's "I Don't Want to Know" from the episode "Rumours", was given an "A−" by Entertainment Weekly Sandra Gonzalez, and Futterman said it was "better than Quinn and Sam's 'Lucky, which she had called "charming" when it was performed in "Duets".

Reception

Critical response
The character of Finn has gotten mixed to positive reviews from television critics. VanDerWerff praised the "terrific" cast in the pilot episode, and wrote that Monteith and Michele "are both agreeable and a little desperate for an outlet as the show choir's central two singers". The Chicago Tribune Maureen Ryan opined that "Cory Monteith gives quarterback Finn Hudson a jock-ish authority mixed with an appealingly square naivete." Korbi Ghosh of Zap2it enjoyed Finn's "sweet nature" and observed, "it's clear that at Finn's core, he's a good person." Shawna Malcom of the Los Angeles Times noted a contradiction in his characterization in the episode "Preggers"—she questioned whether the intelligence he demonstrated in striving for a football scholarship was incongruent in a character who believed he had impregnated Quinn by sharing a hot tub with her.

Goldman welcomed the emergence of Finn's "darker side" as he manipulated Rachel in "The Rhodes Not Taken", as "up until now, Finn's been a bit too straight-laced to totally invest in". Denise Martin of the Los Angeles Times added, "Did anyone not want to kill Finn for coming on to Rachel to get her to come back to the club? (Yes, the logic was there. He wants to win a scholarship so he can provide for the baby he thinks is his. But a girl's heart is a fragile thing, and like Rachel tells him, he could have just tried being honest.)" In his review of "Ballad", Goldman commented: "Finn singing 'I'll Stand By You' to the unborn baby he thinks is his was very sweet". He found the scene that followed Finn's revelation of Quinn's pregnancy to her parents the grimmest on Glee to that point. The intense sequence featuring Finn, Kurt and Burt in "Theatricality" garnered praise for Monteith from James Poniewozik of Time, who wrote: "One thing I love about his performance, here and throughout Glee, is that he plays Finn as a kid, which of course he still is. He's basically a good kid, but as his 'faggy' outburst shows, he's flawed and often overwhelmed. And while he has little to do during Burt's lecture but react, his reactions are great: he's scared and defensive, but shows Finn's guilt at the same time."

When Finn's mother marries Kurt's father in the second season's eighth episode, "Furt", Stack was pleased to see Finn being featured: "It’s been a while since we’ve gotten some Finn focus, and I think I just missed Cory Monteith. But I also forgot what a good, natural actor he can be." While giving "The Sue Sylvester Shuffle" episode a "C" grade, VanDerWerff wrote as an aside, "Let’s pause for a moment to give Cory Monteith some praise, though, since he was asked to do a lot of difficult things in this episode, in regards to selling the idea of Finn as a leader, bringing disparate groups together, and he mostly managed that task, much better than he has in past episodes." While reviewing "Funeral", the season's penultimate episode, Gonzalez said, "I was glad that the writers chose […] Finn and Kurt to be the ones to connect with Sue because I think they're two of the most genuine characters on the show. […] I think they pulled it off well." In his review of "Funeral", VanDerVerff noted that Finn was not the best vocalist among the male students: "the show hits on something very odd in its DNA: Finn continues to be the male lead of the group because he’s the male lead of the show, less because he’s the best singer New Directions has. [...] But because he’s trying to get better, that’s OK".

At the conclusion of the second season, Poniewozik wrote that he had not found the relationship between Finn and Rachel "the most compelling story" of the season, and as such "didn't enjoy 'New York' as much as [he] might have", and VanDerWerff commented that their storyline had "ceased being too interesting long ago." However, the former conceded "I may not be that invested in Finn/Rachel, but the startling moment where the audience disappeared in the middle of their kiss made me feel like I was", and the latter opined that their kiss resonated, despite being unoriginal and "too neat way of suggesting that Rachel can't have both Finn and her Broadway dreams".

Accolades
Monteith won the 2011 Teen Choice Award in the Choice TV: Actor Comedy category for his portrayal of Finn, and was a member of the Glee cast ensemble given the Outstanding Performance by an Ensemble in a Comedy Series award at the 16th Screen Actors Guild Awards. He received several other nominations for the role, including Teen Choice Awards in 2009 for Choice TV: Breakout Star Male and in 2010 for Choice TV: Comedy Actor, and the 17th Screen Actors Guild Awards ensemble nomination for Outstanding Performance by an Ensemble in a Comedy Series.

References

External links 
 Finn Hudson at Fox.com

Glee (TV series) characters
Fictional basketball players
Fictional characters from Ohio
Television characters introduced in 2009
Fictional players of American football
Male characters in television
Fictional rock musicians
Fictional singers
Fictional mechanics
Teenage characters in television

pt:Anexo:Lista de personagens de Glee#Finn Hudson